D.J. Thompson (born May 2, 1985) is an American professional basketball player. He is 1.74 m (5 ft 8 ½ in) in height and he plays the point guard position. He last played for Best Balıkesir of the Turkish Basketball Second League.

Amateur career
Thompson played his high school basketball in Raleigh, North Carolina at Leesville Road High School and he played collegiality at Appalachian State University, where he had career averages of 13.0 points per game, 4.1 assists per game and 2.8 rebounds per game. In his senior year of college, he averaged 15.6 points per game, 4.9 assists per game and 3.3 rebounds per game. He led the Mountaineers to a 25-8 record, to the Southern Conference North Division title, and to a National Invitation Tournament (NIT) bid. During his senior year his team managed to get wins over Davidson College, Wichita State University, the University of Virginia, Virginia Commonwealth University and Vanderbilt University.

External links
 D.J. Thompson's player page on club's official website (Polish)

1985 births
Living people
AEK B.C. players
African-American basketball players
American expatriate basketball people in France
American expatriate basketball people in Greece
American expatriate basketball people in Poland
American expatriate basketball people in Turkey
American men's basketball players
Appalachian State Mountaineers men's basketball players
Antalya Büyükşehir Belediyesi players
AZS Koszalin players
Basketball players from Louisiana
Basketball players from Raleigh, North Carolina
Best Balıkesir B.K. players
Büyükçekmece Basketbol players
Greek Basket League players
Ilysiakos B.C. players
KK Włocławek players
People from Leesville, Louisiana
Point guards
STB Le Havre players